The Flying Gang was an 18th-century group of pirates who established themselves in Nassau, New Providence in the Bahamas after the destruction of Port Royal in Jamaica. The gang consisted of the most notorious and cunning pirates of the time, and they terrorized and pillaged the Caribbean until the Royal Navy and infighting brought them to justice. They achieved great fame and wealth by raiding salvagers attempting to recover gold from the sunken Spanish treasure fleet. They established their own codes and governed themselves independent from any of the colonial powers of the time. Nassau was deemed the Republic of Pirates as it attracted many former privateers looking for work to its shores. The Governor of Bermuda stated that there were over 1,000 pirates in Nassau at that time and that they outnumbered the mere hundred inhabitants in the town.

Benjamin Hornigold

Benjamin Hornigold turned to piracy in the aftermath of the War of the Spanish Succession, seeing great opportunity in the Bahamas to intercept Spanish and French shipping; an appealing idea to earn his way after the Royal Navy was financially drained and the Admiralty mothballed its fleet, releasing over half of its labour force. Hornigold's career in piracy began with dividing his men into three different parties to raid Spanish plantations spotted along the Caribbean coast, to further launch a year-long reign of terror over the Caribbean, capturing an estimated 60,000 pounds. In November 1715, Hornigold seized the English ship Mary, a sloop with capacity for 140 men and six guns, and in this, he sailed into Nassau harbour along with a captured Spanish vessel. He then proclaimed that every pirate in the area would fall under his protection. Hornigold called this group of ruffians the Flying Gang and took over Nassau, making it a pirate haven. Hornigold remained reluctant to attack English ships, though he would encourage his allies, such as Samuel Bellamy, to do so. Hornigold's patriotism was infuriating for his crew members and they mutinied and cast Hornigold aside as captain. When in September 1717 King George I issued a proclamation granting royal pardon for all piracies committed, Hornigold, who regularly regarded himself as more a privateer than a pirate, saw an opportunity to invest his booty into legal trade. In 1719, Hornigold resumed full-time work as a privateer under the operations of Woodes Rogers, Governor of The Bahamas. Hornigold spent the remainder of his life hunting his old prodigies.

Henry Jennings

The Flying Gang's co-founder, Henry Jennings, started his infamous pirating career after the War of the Spanish Succession and his fearsome reputation developed after one venturous raid in July, 1715. A hurricane sunk a Spanish treasure fleet just off of Florida and King Philip V of Spain declared the treasure to be rightful property of Spain. Spanish crews were immediately dispatched to salvage the wreck. Jennings outnumbered the Spanish, who had built a fort at St Augustine to protect the treasure, and Jennings took the treasure for himself. Jennings mentored other well-known pirates such as Charles Vane and "Calico Jack" Rackham. Jennings was also known for a botched attack on a French merchant vessel, causing great diplomatic unrest. Driven by greed, Jennings friend, Sam Bellamy, double-crossed Jennings, leading Jennings to brutally kill a group of captured British and French prisoners in retaliation. When Jennings returned to Jamaica following his latest raid, he found himself officially declared a pirate by King George I. Forced to flee, he headed for the Bahamas, setting up a new life in the New Providence. He became the unofficial governor of Nassau and received a formal pardon from Governor of Bahamas, Woodes Rogers. Henry Jennings was an unusual pirate because he lived to enjoy old age.

Edward Teach

Edward Teach, more famously known as Blackbeard, may be the most legendary and terrifying pirate from the Golden Age of Piracy. Teach met and joined the crew of Benjamin Hornigold in the New Providence after Teach had concluded his time as a privateer in the War of the Spanish Succession. The two became a dynamic duo, successfully raiding ships and pirating throughout the West Indies. When Hornigold retired in 1717 and gave his head title to Teach, Stede Bonnet joined Teach's crew. In November 1717, Teach attacked a French merchant vessel La Concorde off the coast of Saint Vincent. He took the ship for his own and renamed it Queen Anne's Revenge, equipping it with 40 guns. Teach would wear three pistols across his chest and put lit matches under his hat to create a terrifying mist, creating a notorious and fearsome look about him. There are no verified accounts of Teach murdering or harming his captives, despite his reputation. In June 1718, Teach ventured to the Governor of North Carolina for a pardon after having stripped the Revenge of its provisions and marooned its crew. He settled in Bath with a wife and found work as a privateer in 1718. While on an expedition, Teach encountered Charles Vane and a group of other infamous individuals including Calico Jack, Robert Deal, and Israel Hands. They spent several drunken nights loitering together until Lieutenant Robert Maynard was ordered to capture Teach. This led to a bloody battle upon Maynard's ship and Teach was eventually killed after being stabbed 20 times and shot at least 5 times. His head was later hung from the bow of Maynard's ship. There is also documentation that his name was "Thatch" instead of "Teach", since "Thatch" is a recognized name in the British Navy during his training years but "Teach" is not.

Charles Vane

Charles Vane was a pirate renowned for his sadistic and cruel ways. He ignored the Pirate code and showed little respect for his fellow crew members, despite his wittiness and skillfulness when it came to sailing. He was merciless towards his prisoners, turning to torture and murder when given the opportunity. Yet, Vane was admired for his great navigating and fighting skills. He made his first appearance in piracy history when he became a sailor of Captain Henry Jennings' crew. After Jennings' crew raided Spanish camps that had salvaged sunken treasure from a Spanish Treasure Fleet in 1715, Vane used his share to outfit his own ship, renaming it Ranger. For two years, Vane used Nassau as a base for plundering merchant ships, along with many other notorious pirates collectively known as the Flying Gang. Vane declined a pardon from the Governor of The Bahamas, Woodes Rogers, and was later pursued by Benjamin Hornigold, who was under Rogers employ. Vane escaped to the Carolinas and on one occasion, conducted a blockade of Charleston Port. It is said that Vane's piracy almost stopped the slave trade at one point because of so few ships entering port. Vane later faced mutiny by his crew members, who disapproved of his wicked ways and selfishness. Eventually, Vane was ditched as captain and left on a small ship and in his place, his quartermaster, Calico Jack, was named captain. Vane was imprisoned in Port Royal by Captain Holford in 1719. Vane's former accomplices spoke out against him during trial and Vane gave no defense. Vane's piracy career was the most successful of any pirate, but it was his ego that eventually cost him his life. Vane was hanged on 29 March 1721 and his body was hung at Gun Bay as a warning to others who defied the law.

"Calico Jack" Rackham

John Rackham started his pirate career during the mutiny against Charles Vane after he refused to attack a French ship. He is most known for his flag, the Jolly Roger, and that his crew consisted of both men and women. When Rackham went to Nassau he met Anne Bonny and started an affair with her. The two of them went out on the seas and recruited people from the ships they attacked. Rackham was captured after a drunken battle and he was sent to Port Royal to be hanged. His body was later gibbeted and put on display on a very small islet at a main entrance to Port Royal now known as Rackham's Cay.

Stede Bonnet

Stede Bonnet was a plantation owner on Barbados before he became a pirate. He became known as the "Gentleman Pirate". He plundered ships on the east coast of America before meeting up with Blackbeard in Nassau. During his battles he was wounded and could not lead, instead he followed Blackbeard and his crew during many successful raids. Bonnet lost almost everything when his crew left him to serve aboard the Queen Anne's Revenge.

Mary Read

Mary Read started her career in the Royal Navy disguised as a man. She became one of the pirates in Nassau after her ship was captured. In 1720, she joined Jack Rackham's crew. It is said that she only revealed that she was a woman to Anne Bonny. When she and Bonny were captured she said that they were pregnant to avoid hanging. She became sick and died in prison.

Anne Bonny

Anne Bonny was a married woman who moved to Nassau sometime between 1714 and 1718, according to A General History of the Pyrates, a book published in 1724 by Captain Charles Johnson, a pen name for an author who remains unknown. According to this account, Bonny met Calico Jack Rackham and fell in love with him. She left her husband and joined Jack and Mary Read to become a pirate. British authorities captured Bonny and other members of Rackham's crew off Jamaica in 1720. Bonny, Jack, and several others were tried Nov. 28, 1720, near Kingston, Jamaica. Bonny was found guilty and sentenced to death. Upon sentencing, Bonny revealed that she was pregnant, and the judge spared her life. There is no record of her after this moment which has led to much speculation about what happened to her.

Samuel "Black Sam" Bellamy

Sam Bellamy got his nickname Black Sam from the way he dressed. He always wore a black coat and avoided wigs. Instead he showed his natural black hair. After a mutiny to Benjamin Hornigold in 1716, Bellamy became one of the richest pirates ever. New investigations of his flagship Whydah show that when he died in 1717, he had over five tons of cargo.

Olivier "La Buse" Levasseur

Like so many other Pirates, Olivier Levasseur did not want to stop being a pirate after the end of the War of Spanish Succession. He was called the "Buzzard" for his bold attacks and raids. Levasseur had an enormous treasure that is worth an estimated £1 billion. When he was about to be hanged in 1730, he threw away a cryptogram that he said would lead to his treasure. Many adventurers and treasure hunters have searched for the treasure, but none have found it.

Paulsgrave Williams

Paulsgrave Williams was Bellamy's companion and with him looted the remains of the Spanish Treasure Fleet in 1716. But when he arrived much of the treasure had already been taken. Williams decided to "relieve" other ships of their treasure instead and started his career as a pirate. Unlike his partner Williams always wore a white wig. Many people commented on the big contrast between his white hair and sunburned skin.

Edward England

Edward England was captured by the pirate captain Christopher Winter and forced to join the crew. He took part in Henry Jennings' expedition for the sunken 1715 Treasure Fleet off the coast of Florida, and then began sailing with Charles Vane in 1718. Other prominent pirates accepting the King's Pardon, England and some of his men sailed for Africa. Along his way he spawned the career of Bartholomew Roberts, among others.

References

18th-century pirates
Caribbean pirates